Vocabulary learning is the process acquiring building blocks in second language acquisition Restrepo Ramos (2015). The impact of vocabulary on proficiency in second language performance "has become […] an object of considerable interest among researchers, teachers, and materials developers" (Huckin & Coady, 1999, p. 182). From being a "neglected aspect of language learning" (Meara, 1980, as cited in Xu & Hsu, 2017) vocabulary gained recognition in the literature and reclaimed its position in teaching. Educators shifted their attention from accuracy to fluency by moving from the Grammar translation method to communicative approaches to teaching. As a result, incidental vocabulary teaching and learning became one of the two major types of teaching programs along with the deliberate approach.

Goals of vocabulary learning 
Vocabulary learning goals help in deciding the kind of language to be learnt and taught. Nation (2000) suggests three types of information to keep in mind while deciding on the goals. 1)number of words in the target language. 2) Number of words known by the native speakers. 3) The number of words required to use another language. It is very difficult to know all the words in a language as even native speakers don't know all the words. There are many specialized vocabularies that only a specific set of people know. In this context if somebody wants to count all the words in a language, it is useful to be familiar with terms such as tokens, types, lemmas, and word families. If we count the words as they appear in language, even if they are repeated, the words are called tokens. If we count all the words but not counting the repetition of a word, the words are called types. A lemma is the head word and some of its reduced and inflected forms.

Types and strategies of vocabulary learning
There are two major types of vocabulary learning: deliberate and incidental. Vocabulary learning types and low-frequency are important components in a vocabulary teaching program. The two major types of vocabulary learning are deliberate and low-frequency. It is important to treat these types as complementary -rather than mutually exclusive- by using different vocabulary learning strategies and their combinations.

Scott Thornbury (2002) describes these types by stating that "some of the words will be learned actively", while others "will be picked up incidentally" (p. 32). Dodigovic (2013) and Nation (2006) emphasize the same distinction - only using a different term for the one side of this dichotomy: deliberate vocabulary learning. Nation (2006) also adds another nuance to this concept by calling it "deliberate, decontextualized vocabulary learning" (p. 495). Elgort (2011) to uses the term deliberate, while DeCarrico (2001) prefers to talk about "explicit versus implicit learning" (p. 10). Other authors, although employing various terminology are also in favor of this same distinction. For example, throughout their article, Alemi and Tayebi (2011) talk of “incidental and intentional” vocabulary learning, as does also Hulstijn (2001). Expanding the terminology even further, Gu (2003) uses the terms “explicit and implicit learning mechanisms” throughout his article in discussing the second language learning strategies.  Whatever terminology is used in the literature by different authors, the two major types of vocabulary learning are discussed: explicit and incidental. These two concepts should not be perceived as competitors but rather as mutually reinforcing (Nation, 2006b).

In both types of vocabulary learning or their combination, the efficiency of learning is achieved by following one or more of the vocabulary learning strategies. Different researchers look into the nature of this concept from various perspectives. Given that vocabulary learning strategies are very diverse, Schmitt(2000) suggests a summary of major vocabulary learning strategies and classify them into five groups: determination, social, memory, cognitive and meta-cognitive. Building on this classification, Xu and Hsu (2017) suggest two major categories of vocabulary learning strategies – direct and indirect. The first category includes four types of strategies: memory, cognitive and compensation strategies; the second category contains the meta-cognitive, effective and social strategies. Based on their research, Lawson and Hogben (1996) distinguish repetition as the major strategy of vocabulary learning, while Mokhtar et al. (2009) explain that ESL students prefer vocabulary strategies such as guessing and using a dictionary.

Deliberate Vocabulary Learning
One of the major types of vocabulary learning in language acquisition is deliberate vocabulary learning. Before moving on to presenting the literature, it is important to mention that when talking about deliberate vocabulary learning, various terminologies are used by different linguists and writers. Elgort and Warren (2014), as well as Schmitt (2000), use the term explicit (which is mostly used for grammar teaching), while Nation (2006) uses the word decontextualized vocabulary learning and contrasts the term with "learning from context" (p. 494) without explicitly using the term incidental vocabulary learning. Intentional vocabulary learning (Dodigovic, Jeaco & Wei, 2017; Hulstijn, 2001), active learning (Thornbury, 2002), and direct instruction (Lawrence et al., 2010) are also used. However, throughout this paper, the term deliberate (Elgort, 2011; Nation, 2006) will be used to refer to this concept.
 
The advocates of deliberate vocabulary learning paradigm -for example, Coady, 1993; Nation, 1990, 2001, as cited in Ma & Kelly, 2006- agree that context is the main source for vocabulary acquisition. However, they also believe that in order to be able to build up sufficient vocabulary and acquire the necessary strategies to handle the context when reading, learners need support. Thus, extensive reading may be sufficient for developing advanced students’ vocabulary, but it has to be supplemented with deliberate vocabulary learning at lower proficiency levels (Elgort & Warren, 2014). Kennedy (2003) supports this notion and argues that deliberate learning is more appropriate for students with up to an intermediate level of proficiency, while incidental learning, which can occur outside the classroom, is more valuable with higher proficiency students. The limited classroom time should be spent on the deliberate teaching of vocabulary (Schmitt, 2000), as the main problem of vocabulary teaching is that only a few words, or a small part of what is required to know a word, can be taught at a time (Ma & Kelly, 2006). Ma and Kelly (2006) argue that learning a word requires more “deliberate mental effort” than merely being engaged in meaning-focused activities. However, according to the authors, the advocates of deliberate approach believe that it should be combined with incidental learning to be more efficient.

Schmitt (2000) demonstrates that deliberate vocabulary learning, unlike incidental learning, is time-consuming, and too laborious. Moreover, according to Nation (2005), deliberate vocabulary learning is “one of the least efficient ways” to improve students’ vocabulary knowledge. Yet, he claims that it is a vital component in vocabulary teaching programs. However, Schmitt (2000) states that deliberate vocabulary learning gives the learners the “greatest chance” for acquiring vocabulary, as it focuses their attention directly on the target vocabulary. He presents an important concept from the field of psychology: “the more one manipulates, thinks about, and uses mental information, the more likely it is that one will retain that information” (p. 121). The deeper the processing, the more likely it is for the newly learned words to be remembered. Therefore, explicit attention should also be given to vocabulary, especially when the aim is language-focused learning (Nation, 2006b). According to Ellis (1994, as cited in Laufer & Hulstijn, 2001), while the meaning of a word requires “conscious processing” and is learned deliberately, the articulation of its form is learned incidentally because of frequent exposure. Ma and Kelly (2006) mention the necessity of establishing a link between the meaning and form of a word by various strategies, e.g., “direct memorization,” which is a strategy of deliberate vocabulary teaching.

In vocabulary teaching programs, it is also necessary to consider the frequency of the words (Nation, 2006b). Thus, high-frequency words deserve to be taught explicitly (Kennedy, 2003) and sometimes even low-frequency words can be taught and learned deliberately, for example through word cards, word part analysis, and dictionary as recommended by Nation (2006b). However, when measuring the difficulty by the results, deliberate vocabulary learning is easier than incidental learning, yet it needs more focused effort. Therefore, directing deliberate attention to the particular aspect can lighten "the learning burden" (Nation, 2006a).

To sum up, deliberate vocabulary learning is essential to reach a threshold of the vocabulary size and it is a prerequisite to incidental learning (Schmitt, 2000).

Incidental Vocabulary Learning
Another type of vocabulary learning is called incidental vocabulary learning. By its nature, incidental vocabulary learning is one of the key aspects of language acquisition. This concept, which is also referred to as passive learning (Shmidth, 1990; as cited in Alemi & Tayebi, 2011) or implicit learning (Gu, 2003), is the process of acquiring vocabulary without placing the focus on specific words to be learned (Paribakht & Wesche, 1999). It is deemed that, this type of learning should occur with low-frequency words (Nation, 2005) as the first few thousand words are better learned through deliberate learning approach (Huckin & Coady 1999). However, this may be hampered by the fact that several encounters with a word are needed before it is committed to memory (Nation, 1990), which may not be possible with low-frequency words (Nation 1990).
Aelmi and Tayebi (2011) as well as Schmitt (2000) link incidental vocabulary learning with the communicative context. The formers stress that incidental vocabulary learning occurs by "picking up structures and lexicon of a language, through getting engaged in a variety of communicative activities" (p. 82), while the latter indicates that producing language for communicational purposes results in incidental learning.

There is a number of factors which affect the occurrence of incidental vocabulary learning. Most of the scholars agree that the best way is through extensive reading (Jian-ping, 2013; Restrepo Ramos, 2015). Restrepo Ramos (2015) indicates that “there is strong evidence that supports the occurrence of incidental vocabulary learning through reading for meaning comprehension” (p. 164).  However, as research shows, 95% of the words must be familiar to the reader to understand a text (Hirsh & Nation, 1992; Laufer, 1989). According to Nation (2009), this figure is even higher, i.e., 98 percent. Huckin & Coady (1999), on the other hand, argue that "extensive reading for meaning does not automatically lead to the acquisition of vocabulary. Much depends on the context surrounding each word, and the nature of the learner's attention" (p. 183). While Dodigovic (2015) finds that it is the approach that matters, i.e., the bottom-up processing of readings is better than the top-down. Thus, to develop incidental vocabulary learning, the learners should be exposed to the words in different informative contexts, following the bottom-up processing of the readings.

References
Alemi, M., & Tayebi, A. (2011). The influence of incidental and intentional vocabulary acquisition and vocabulary strategy use on learning L2 vocabularies. Journal of Language Teaching and Research, 2(1), 81-98. DOI:10.4304/jltr.2.1. 
Decarrico, J. S. (2001). Vocabulary learning and teaching. Teaching English as a second or foreign language, 3, 285-299.
Dodigovic, M. (2013). Vocabulary learning: An electronic word card study. Perspectives 20(1). TESOL Arabia Publications.
Dodigovic, M. (2015). How incidental is incidental vocabulary learning? In Gitsaki, C., Gobert, M., & Demirci, H. (Eds.), (pp. 203-215). *Current issues in reading, writing and visual literacy: Research and practice. Cambridge: Cambridge Scholars.
Dodigovic, M., Jeaco, S., & Wei, R. (2017). Trends in Vocabulary Research. TESOL International Journal, 12(1), 1-6.
Elgort, I. (2011). Deliberate Learning and Vocabulary Acquisition in a Second Language. Language Learning, 61(2), 367-413.
Elgort, I., & Warren, P. (2014). L2 Vocabulary Learning From Reading: Explicit and Tacit Lexical Knowledge and the Role of Learner and Item Variables. Language Learning, 64(2): 365–414. DOI:10.1111/lang.12052
Gu, P. (2003). Vocabulary learning in a second language: Person, Task, Context and Strategies. The Electronic Journal for English as a Second Language, 7(2). http://www.tesl-ej.org/wordpress/issues/volume7/ej26/ej26a4/?wscr  
Hirsh and Nation, P. (1992). What vocabulary size is needed to read unsimplified texts for pleasure? Reading in a Foreign Language, 8(2), 689-696. 
Huckin, T., & Coady, J. (1999). Incidental vocabulary acquisition in a second language. Studies in Second Language Acquisition, 21(2), 181-193.
Hulstijn, J. H. (2001). Intentional and incidental second-language vocabulary learning: A reappraisal of elaboration, rehearsal and automaticity. In P. Robinson (Ed.), Cognition and Second Language Instruction, 258-286. Cambridge: Cambridge University Press.
Jian-ping, L. (2013). Is incidental vocabulary acquisition feasible to EFL learning? English Language Teaching, 6(10), 245-251. 
Kennedy, G. (2003). Amplifier Collocations in the British National Corpus: Implications for English Language Teaching. TESOL Quarterly, 37(3), 467-487. DOI:10.2307/3588400
Laufer, B. (1989). What percentage of text-lexis is essential for comprehension? In Lauren, Ch., & Nordman, M. (Eds.). Special language: From humans thinking to thinking machines, Multiligual Matters, 316-323
Laufer, B. & Hulstijn, J. (2001). Incidental vocabulary acquisition in a second language: The construct of task-induced involvement. Applied Linguistics, 22(1), 1-26. 
Lawrence, J., Capotosto, L., Branum-Martin, L., White, C., & Snow, C. (2010). Language proficiency, home-language status, and English vocabulary development: A longitudinal follow-up of the Word Generation program. Unpublished manuscript, Harvard University.
Lawson, M., & Hogben, D. (1996). The vocabulary-learning strategies of foreign-language students. Language Learning, 46(1), 101-135. 
Ma, Q., & Kelly, P. (2006). Computer assisted vocabulary learning: Design and evaluation. Computer Assisted Language Learning, 19(1), 15-45. 
Mokhtar, A., Rawian, R., Yahaya, M., Abdullah, A., & Mohamed, A. (2009). Vocabulary learning strategies of adult ESL learners. The English Teacher, 38, 133-145.
 Nation, P. (1990). Teaching and learning vocabulary. Boston, MA: Heinle and Heinle.
Nation, P. (2005) Teaching vocabulary. Asian EFL Journal.
Nation, P. (2006a). Vocabulary: Second language. In K. Brown (ed.). Encyclopaedia of Language and Linguistics, 2nd Ed. Oxford: Elsevier, 6, 448-454.
Nation, P. (2006b). Language education - vocabulary. In K. Brown (ed.) Encyclopaedia of Language and Linguistics, 6, 2nd Ed. Oxford: Elsevier, 494-499.
Nation, P. (2009). Teaching ESL/EFL reading and writing. New York: Routledge.  
Pariribakht, T., & Wesche, M. (1999). Reading and ‘incidental’ L2 vocabulary acquisition: An introspective study of lexical referencing. Studies in Second Language Acquisition, 21(1), 195-224. 
Restrepo Ramos, F. D. (2015). I ncidental vocabulary learning in second language acquisition: A literature review. PROFILE: Issues In Teachers' Professional Development, 17(1), 157-166.
Schmitt, N. (2000). Vocabulary in language teaching. Cambridge: Cambridge University Press. 
Thornbury, S. (2002). How to teach vocabulary. Edinburgh Gate: Pearson Education Limited. 
Xu, X., & Hsu, W-Ch. (2017). A new inventory of vocabulary learning strategy for Chinese tertiary EFL learners. TESOL International Journal, 12(1), 7-31.

Specific

Learing types
Learning to read
Lexicography
Language acquisition